Borama District is a district of the Awdal region in Somaliland.

Demographics
The Awdal region in which the district is situated is inhabited by people from the Somali ethnic group, with the Gadabuursi subclan of the Dir especially well represented and considered the predominant clan of the region.

Federico Battera (2005) states about the Awdal Region:
"Awdal is mainly inhabited by the Gadabuursi confederation of clans."

A UN Report published by Canada: Immigration and Refugee Board of Canada (1999), states concerning Awdal:
"The Gadabuursi clan dominates Awdal region. As a result, regional politics in Awdal is almost synonymous with Gadabuursi internal clan affairs."

Roland Marchal (1997) states that numerically, the Gadabuursi are the predominant inhabitants of the Awdal Region:
"The Gadabuursi's numerical predominance in Awdal virtually ensures that Gadabuursi interests drive the politics of the region."

Marleen Renders and Ulf Terlinden (2010) both state that the Gadabuursi almost exclusively inhabit the Awdal Region:
"Awdal in western Somaliland is situated between Djibouti, Ethiopia and the Issaq-populated mainland of Somaliland. It is primarily inhabited by the three sub-clans of the Gadabursi clan, whose traditional institutions survived the colonial period, Somali statehood and the war in good shape, remaining functionally intact and highly relevant to public security."

There is also a sizeable minority of the Issa subclan of the Dir who mainly inhabit the Zeila district.

See also
Administrative divisions of Somaliland
Regions of Somaliland
Districts of Somaliland

References

External links
 Districts of Somalia
 Administrative map of Borama District

Districts of Somaliland
Awdal